The Bulkley Ranges is mountain range in northern British Columbia, Canada, located between the Skeena and Bulkley Rivers south of Hazelton, north of the Morice River and Zymoetz River. It has an area of 7851 km2 and is a subrange of the Hazelton Mountains which in turn form part of the Interior Mountains.

Sub-ranges
Bornite Range
Howson Range
O.K. Range
Rocher Déboulé Range
Telkwa Range

See also
List of mountain ranges

References

Hazelton Mountains
Skeena Country
Bulkley Valley